Dismorphia thermesia, the pretty mimic white, is a butterfly in the family Pieridae. It is found in Guyana, Brazil, Ecuador, Peru, and western Bolivia. The habitat consists of transitional rainforests and cloudforests.

The wingspan is about  Adult males have a prominent black bar on the upperside of the forewings, extending from the basal area to the end of the discal cell. Females lack this bar and have more rounded wings.

References

Dismorphiinae
Pieridae of South America
Lepidoptera of Brazil
Lepidoptera of Ecuador
Fauna of the Amazon
Butterflies described in 1819
Taxa named by Jean-Baptiste Godart